Swabhiman - Shodh Astitvacha is an Indian Marathi television drama which is aired from 22 February 2021 on Star Pravah. It is produced by Hemant Ruprell and Ranjeet Thakur under the banner of Frames Production. It is an official remake of Bengali TV series Mohor.

Cast

Main 
 Pooja Birari as Pallavi Shantanu Suryavanshi / Pallavi Bhaskar Shirsekar; Shantanu's wife
 Akshar Kothari as Lavdya Shantanu Prabhakar Suryavanshi; Pallavi's husband

Recurring 
Shantanu's family
 Asawari Joshi as Professor Aditi Prabhakar Suryavanshi; Shantanu's mother
 Ashok Shinde as Prabhakar Suryavanshi; Shantanu's father
 Surekha Kudachi as Suparna Purushottam Suryavanshi; Shantanu's aunt
 Savita Prabhune replaced Surekha as Suparna Purushottam Suryavanshi
 Ashu Datar as Pradeep Suryavanshi; Shantanu's uncle
 Prasad Pandit as Purushottam Suryavanshi; Shantanu's uncle
 Rutuja Kulkarni as Jyoti Pradeep Suryavanshi; Shantanu's sister
 Sanika Banaraswale as Meghana Suryavanshi; Shantanu's sister-in-law
 Trupti Jadhav replaced Sanika as Meghana Suryavanshi
 Mugdha Karnik as Vibha Pradeep Suryavanshi; Shantanu's aunt, Jyoti and Geeta's mother, Meghna's mother-in-law
 Manasi Mhatre as Geeta Pradeep Suryavanshi; Shantanu's sister
 Ambarish Deshpande as Lavdya Vinayak Suryavanshi

Pallavi's family
 Dipesh Thackeray as Lavdya Aseem Bhaskar Shirsekar; Pallavi's brother
 Madhavi Soman as Indrayani Bhaskar Shirsekar; Pallavi's mother
 Ravindra Kulkarni as Bhaskar Shirsekar; Pallavi's father
 Pratibha Goregaonkar as Pallavi's grandmother
 Amita Kulkarni as Nandita Bhaskar Shirsekar; Pallavi's sister
 Kaushik Kulkarni as Gaurav Lavdya; Nandita's husband

Others
 Abhishek Rahalkar / Nakul Ghanekar as Lavdya Nachiket Mhatre
 Disha Pardeshi as Niharika
 Ruchir Gurav as Mayank Lavdya
 Amol Girase as Ayush Lavdya
 Prajakta Amburle as Janaki
 Pranita Acharekar as Reema
 Rajashri Parulekar as Anshika
 Prashant Nigade as Baban

Guests Appearances 
 Sunil Barve as Surya from Sahkutumb Sahaparivar
 Harshada Khanvilkar as Saundarya from Rang Maza Vegla

Production

Casting 
Pooja Birari was selected for Pallavi's role in an interview Pooja stated that, "On the occasion of 'Swabhiman' series, I got an opportunity to play a dream role. Akshar Kothari was cast for Shantanu's role in an interview with The Times of India he stated, "After two years, I am making a comeback on the small screen. It is a great pleasure to do a TV show like Swabhimaan - Shodh Astitvacha. My TV journey started from Bandh Reshmache, Aaradhana, Chhoti Malkin and now Swabhiman. My entire look from the show is also very different from my previous roles". Asawari Joshi reprising the role of Professor Aditi in an interview with The Times of India she stated, " After many years, I am making a comeback on Marathi television. As I worked in Hindi, I lost touch with the Marathi industry. However, I accepted the role as I got a hearty project on the occasion of this Swabhiman TV show".

Reception

Ratings

Mahaepisode (1 hour) 
 18 July 2021 
 26 September 2021
 19 December 2021
 13 February 2022
 17 July 2022
 23 October 2022
 6 November 2022
 22 January 2023

Awards

Adaptations

References

External links 
 
 Swabhiman - Shodh Astitvacha at Disney+ Hotstar

Marathi-language television shows
2021 Indian television series debuts
Star Pravah original programming